The 1975 Tasman Series, (officially the Tasman Championship for Drivers), was a motor racing competition open to Racing Cars complying with the Tasman Formula. Contested over eight rounds in New Zealand and Australia beginning on 5 January and ending on 23 February, it was the twelfth and final Tasman Series. The series was organised jointly by the Motorsport Association of New Zealand and the Confederation of Australian Motorsport and was promoted as the Peter Stuyvesant International Series for the 1975 Tasman Championship.

The series was won by Australian driver Warwick Brown in his fifth year of Formula 5000 racing with the Pat Burke Racing team, driving a Lola T332 Chevrolet. The series was resolved in a dramatic final race inwhat turned out to be the final Tasman Series race of all, at Sandown Raceway. Brown, fellow Australian Johnnie Walker and New Zealander Graeme Lawrence all sat on 30 points prior to the last race. All three struck trouble but with a sixth position Brown claimed the final point in Tasman Series history, breaking the deadlock to win the crown by one point. Race wins had been shared around with Brown and Lawrence each winning twice, with single victories going to Walker, Chris Amon who finished fifth in the points behind the winless but consistent John McCormack, and to Graham McRae and John Goss who each completed partial series runs focussed on their home country events.

In the aftermath of this series, the two legs of the Tasman Series broke apart. The New Zealand half became the Peter Stuyvesant Series and converted to Formula Atlantic in 1977. The Australian half became the Rothmans International Series.

Races

Additional information sourced from:

Points system
Championship points were awarded at each round on the following basis:

Championship Standings

Key

References

1975
Tasman Series
Tasman Series
Formula 5000